Katrina Adams and Zina Garrison were the defending champions of the doubles event but lost in the quarterfinals of the 1989 Virginia Slims of Florida tennis tournament to Manon Bollegraf and Eva Pfaff.

Jana Novotná and Helena Suková won in the final 6–4, 6–2 against Jo Durie and Mary Joe Fernández.

Seeds
Champion seeds are indicated in bold text while text in italics indicates the round in which those seeds were eliminated. The top four seeded teams received byes into the second round.

Draw

Final

Top half

Bottom half

References
 1989 Virginia Slims of Florida Doubles Draw

Virginia Slims of Florida
1989 WTA Tour